Juan Carlos Escobar Rodríguez (born 30 October 1982) is a Colombian former football defensive midfielder.

References

External links

1982 births
Living people
Footballers from Cali
Colombian footballers
Colombia international footballers
Categoría Primera A players
Deportes Quindío footballers
Deportivo Pereira footballers
Atlético Huila footballers
Deportes Tolima footballers
PFC Krylia Sovetov Samara players
Cúcuta Deportivo footballers
Deportivo Cali footballers
América de Cali footballers
Patriotas Boyacá footballers
Alianza Petrolera players
Deportivo Pasto footballers
Uniautónoma F.C. footballers
Colombian expatriate footballers
Expatriate footballers in Russia
Russian Premier League players
Association football midfielders